Estadio Rogelio Livieres is a multi-use stadium in Asunción, Paraguay.  It is currently used mostly for football matches and is the home stadium of Club Guaraní.  The stadium holds 8,000 people.

External links

Picture of the Estadio Rogelio Livieres

Multi-purpose stadiums in Paraguay
Football venues in Asunción
Sports venues in Asunción
Estadio Rogelio Livieres